Asian Americans in Washington may refer to:

 Asian Americans in Washington (state)
 Asian Americans in Washington, D.C.